Visvaldas Kulbokas, JCL (born 14 May 1974) is a Lithuanian prelate of the Catholic Church and a diplomat in the service of the Holy See. He is serving as Apostolic Nuncio to Ukraine since 2021.

Early years
Born in Klaipėda, Visvaldas Kulbokas in 1992 graduated from the local school and then entered the Telšiai Bishop Vincentas Borisevičius Priest Seminary. From 1994 to 2004 he studied in Rome, Italy, at the Pontifical University of the Holy Cross,  where he received a doctorate in theology (2001) and a Licentiate of Canon Law (2004). During his studies, he was ordained to the priesthood for the Diocese of Telšiai by diocesan bishop Antanas Vaičius on 19 July 1998.

Diplomatic service
To prepare for a diplomatic career he entered the Pontifical Ecclesiastical Academy in 2001. He joined the Vatican's diplomatic service on 1 July 2004 and served as secretary to the nuntiature in Lebanon (2004–2007). In 2007–2009 he was an employee of the nunciature in the Netherlands and in Russia (2009–2012). From 2012 to 2020, he worked in the Section for Relations with States of the Secretariat of State of the Holy See. From 2020 to 2021 he was an adviser to the nunciature in Kenya.

Nuncio
On 15 June 2021, Pope Francis appointed him Titular Archbishop of Martanae Tudertinorum and Apostolic Nuncio to Ukraine. 

Kulbokas received his episcopal consecration on 14 August 2021 in the Cathedral Basilica of St Stanislaus and St Ladislaus of Vilnius from Cardinal Pietro Parolin, with Archbishops Petar Antun Rajič, Gintaras Grušas and Bishop  as co-consecrators.

See also 
List of diplomatic missions of the Holy See
 List of heads of the diplomatic missions of the Holy See

References

External links 
 
 

1974 births
Living people
People from Klaipėda
Pontifical University of the Holy Cross alumni
Pontifical Ecclesiastical Academy alumni
21st-century Roman Catholic archbishops in Lithuania
Apostolic Nuncios to Ukraine
Bishops appointed by Pope Francis